Hypericum tetrapterum (syn. H. quadrangulum) is a herbaceous perennial plant species in the flowering plant family Hypericaceae. Its common names include St. Peter's wort, Peterwort, square stemmed St. John's wort, and square stalked St. John's wort.

Description
The stems are square in cross section, with conspicuous wings at the corners. The leaves are in opposite pairs, simple and entire, and have many translucent glandular dots. The flowers are produced in flowerheads of 10–30 flowers (up to 70), each flower  in diameter with 5 pale yellow petals and 5 sepals. There may be black glands on the petals and sepals, as well as on the leaves.

Distribution and habitat
Hypericum tetrapterum is common in damp habitats such as marshes, streamsides, open ditches, meadows, and springs throughout Europe.

References

tetrapterum
Flora of Europe
Plants described in 1828